Thermanaerovibrio acidaminovorans is a moderately thermophilic and anaerobic  bacterium from the genus of Thermanaerovibrio which has been isolated from granular methanogenic sludge from Breda in the Netherlands.

References

Bacteria described in 1997
Synergistota